ICI Ltd v Shatwell [1965] AC 656 is a UK labour law case concerning employer liability for accidents at work.

Facts
Two shot firing brothers were injured because they ‘could not be bothered’ to take the mandatory precautions.

Judgment
Lord Denning MR held that they were not entitled to compensation. The House of Lords had previously ruled in Smith v Baker & Sons [1891] AC 325 that an employee did not implicitly consent to risk arising from a dangerous workplace, and as such the defence of volenti non fit injuria (that an employer is not liable for injury that results from risk that the employee consents to) could not be relied upon in such a situation. However ICI was in full compliance with relevant safety regulations, having safety precautions in place and ensuring that their employees, including the experienced Shatwell, were aware of them. ICI was thus held not to be vicariously liable for compensation for injury resulting from Shatwell's active disregard of his employer's instructions and statutory regulations.

See also

UK labour law
Unfair dismissal

Notes

References

United Kingdom labour case law
House of Lords cases
1965 in case law
1965 in British law
Lord Denning cases